Glauco Onorato (7 December 1936 – 31 December 2009) was an Italian actor and voice actor.

As an actor and dubber popular with audiences throughout Italy, he was renowned for voicing over nearly all of Bud Spencer's roles as Spencer had a thick Naples accent. Onorato had worked consistently from the late 1950s until shortly before his death.

Biography
Onorato was born in Turin and was educated at the Silvio D'Amico National Academy of Dramatic Arts. His father was Giovanni Onorato, also an actor, and his brother was Marco Onorato, who was a cinematographer.

Active in film, theater, and television, Onorato starred in over 31 films and 51 television shows. Among Onorato's most notable roles were as a man haunted by the supernatural in Mario Bava's masterpiece Black Sabbath, a soldier returning from the Russian front in Vittoria De Sica's Sunflower, and as a ruthless gangster in the crime film The Big Racket. He also starred as Leonardo da Vinci's father Piero da Vinci in the television miniseries The Life of Leonardo da Vinci. He also made acting performances on stage. On stage, Onorato starred in the 1978 edition of the 1962 musical comedy play Rugantino and made collaborations with many other stage actors and directors such as Enrico Montesano and Ottavia Piccolo. He also starred as Sir John Falstaff in stage adaptation of The Merry Wives of Windsor.

With a deep, booming, yet comical voice, Onorato gained his greatest fame as a voice actor. He had dubbed many foreign language films and television shows in Italian. He provided the Italian voice for actors such as Danny Glover, James Coburn, Anthony Quinn and Charles Bronson as well as Arnold Schwarzenegger in his earlier and iconic films, most notably The Terminator. He may however be best known for dubbing Italian actor Bud Spencer (whose heavy Neapolitan accent was considered unsuitable for his roles) in nearly all of his movies. In Onorato's animated roles, he provided the Italian voices of Captain Gantu in the Lilo & Stitch franchise, Sykes in Oliver & Company, Professor Ratigan in The Great Mouse Detective and Carface Caruthers in All Dogs Go to Heaven.

Personal life
Onorato had two children: Riccardo Nissem Onorato and Sara Onorato, who are also voice actors.

Death
Onorato died at the San Camillo Hospital in Rome on 31 December 2009, at the age of 73, after battling an undisclosed serious illness for some time.

Filmography

Cinema

Spavaldi e Innamorati (1959)
I Baccanali di Tiberio (1960)
Lo Sceicco Rosso (1962) - Yussuf
Black Sabbath (1963) - Giorgio (segment "I Wurdalak")
Giacobbe, l'Uomo che Lottò con Dio (1963)
Amori Pericolosi (1964) - (segment "La ronda")
Rivincita di Ivanhoe (1965) - Lockheel
In a Colt's Shadow (1965) - Title Sequence Narrator (voice)
Pleasant Nights (1966) - Un soldato
Il Magnifico Texano (1968) - José Pereira
John the Bastard (1967) - Morenillo
Boot Hill (1969) - Finch
Sunflower (1970) - Il reduce
The Scalawag Bunch (1971) - Friar Tuck (voice, uncredited)
W Django! (1971) - Carranza
Incontro (1971) - Claudia and Stefano's Acquaintance
Black Turin (1972) - Rosario Rao (voice, uncredited)
Fra' Tazio da Velletri (1973) - Nuccio Tornaquinci
Li chiamavano i tre moschettieri... invece erano quattro (1973) - Porthos (voice, uncredited)
The Magnificent Dare Devil (1973) - Grossmann
The Five Days (1973) - Zampino
L'Ultimo Uomo di Sara (1974) - Commissario Maras
Wer Stirbt Schon Gerne unter Palmen? (1974) - Paul Cerdan
Carambola, Filotto... Tutti in Buca (1975) - Il supremo
Deep Red (1975) - (uncredited)
Colpita da Improvviso Benessere (1975) - Fernando Proietti
Il Grande Racket (1976) - Mazzarelli
Maria R. e Gli Angeli del Trastevere (1976)
L'altra metà del cielo (1977) - Il ladro pentito
Poliziotto Sprint (1977) - Pistone
Stringimi forte Papà (1977)
Stark System (1980) - Eddy
Zucchero, Miele e Peperoncino (1980) - Duilio Mencacci
Il Vizietto II (1980) - Luigi
Tex e il signore degli abissi (1985) - El Dorado (voice, uncredited)
Chi Nasce Tondo (2008) - Padre Ignazio (final film role)

Television

Il Mondo è una Prigione (1962) (TV Film)
Delitto e Castigo (1963) (TV Film)
Bene Mio Core Mio (1964) - L'architetto (TV Film)
Antony and Cleopatra (1965) - Dolabella (TV Film)
Vita di Dante (1965) - Il maniscalco
Trampoli (1966) - Tita
Caravaggio (1967) - Onorio Longo (TV Film)
I Promessi Sposi (1967) - Il Griso
Vita di Cavour (1967) - Giuseppe Garibaldi
La Roma di Moravia (1967) - Gerardo
La Freccia Nera (1968–1969) - Ellis Duckworth (6 episodes)
I Fratelli Karamazov (1969) - Michail Makàrovic Makarov (2 episodes)
Il Triangolo Rosso (1969) (1 episode)
Antonio Meucci Cittadino Toscano Contro il Monopolio Bell (1970)
La Vita di Leonardo da Vinci (1971) - Ser Piero
Prima, Durante e Dopo la Partita (1972) (TV Film)
Die merkwürdige Lebensgeschichte des Friedrich Freiherrn von der Trenck (1973) - Franz von der Trenck
Assunta Spina (1973) (TV Film)
Door into Darkness (1973) - Police Inspector (1 episode)
Canossa (1974) - L'abate di Cluny
L'Assassinio dei Fratelli Rosselli (1974)
Nucleo Centrale Investigativo (1974) - Maresciallo Di Iorio
Processo per l'Uccisione di Raffaele Sonzogno Giornalista Romano (1975) - Frezza
Dopo un Lungo Silenzio (1978) - Giuseppe Marsaghi
L'Étrange Monsieur Duvallier (1979) - Mozzini (1 episode)
Bambole: Scene di un Delitto Perfetto (1980)
Parole e Sangue (1982) - Maggiore Corrias
I Due Prigionieri (1985) - Signor Varga (TV Film)
La Grande Cabriole (1989)
Donne Armate (1990) - Locasciulli (TV Film)
La piovra, (1992) - Padre Matteo
Tre Passi nel Delitto: Villa Maltraversi (1993) - Riccardo Maltraversi (TV Film)
Uno di noi (1996) - Don Marco
Don Matteo (2000) - Dott. Galimberti (1 episode)
Centovetrine (2001) - Cesare Bettini
Le ali Della Vita 2 (2001)
Sant'Antonio da Padova (2002) - Martino (TV Film)
Luisa Sanfelice (2004) (TV Film)
I Colori della Vita (2005) (TV Film)
L'Amore non Basta (2005) - Gennarino (TV Film)
A Voce Alta (2006) - Raffaele Malato (TV Film)
La Princesa del Polígono (2007) - Sisquet (TV Film)

Dubbing roles

Animation
Gantu in Lilo & Stitch
Gantu in Stitch! The Movie
Gantu in Leroy & Stitch
Professor Rattigan in The Great Mouse Detective
Sykes in Oliver & Company
Carface Caruthers in All Dogs Go to Heaven
Danny in One Hundred and One Dalmatians
Captain of the Guard in Robin Hood
Morbo in Futurama (season 1)
Hernán Cortés in The Road to El Dorado
George Harrison in Yellow Submarine
Kazar in The Wild
Big Indian Chief in Peter Pan (1986 redub)
Kron in Dinosaur

Live action
Terminator in The Terminator
Liberty Valence in The Man Who Shot Liberty Valence
Bernardo O’Reilly in The Magnificent Seven
Roger Murtaugh in Lethal Weapon
Roger Murtaugh in Lethal Weapon 2
Roger Murtaugh in Lethal Weapon 3
Roger Murtaugh in Lethal Weapon 4
Alan "Dutch" Schaefer in Predator
Clubber Lang in Rocky III
Paul Kersey in Death Wish V: The Face of Death
Louis Sedgwick in The Great Escape
Tex Panthollow in Charade
Finis Valorum in Star Wars: Episode I - The Phantom Menace
John Matrix in Commando
Mark Kaminski in Raw Deal
Howard Langston in Jingle All the Way
Harry Tasker in True Lies
Jack Cates in 48 Hrs.
Cecil Fredericks in Night at the Museum
James Jordan in Space Jam
Simon in Grand Canyon
Hershey in 3 A.M.
Ogion in Earthsea
Marty Madison in Dreamgirls
Isaac Johnson in Shooter
Steve Boland in When Hell Broke Loose
Grigori Borzov in Telefon
Franz Propp in Farewell, Friend
Jack Murphy in Murphy’s Law
Jay Killian in Assassination
Rolf Steiner in Cross of Iron
Whit in Ride Lonesome
Nick Casey in The Baltimore Bullet
Jerry Fanon in Firepower
Tobias Alcott in The Man from Elysian Fields
Mr. Crisp in Sister Act 2: Back in the Habit
Glen Whitehouse in Affliction
Bill Sikes in Oliver!
Athos in The Three Musketeers
Dave Averconnelly in Venom
Antonius Proximo in Gladiator
Hutch Bessy in God Forgives... I Don't!
Hutch Bessy in Ace High
Hutch Bessy in Boot Hill
Jelinek in The Fifth Day of Peace
Mesito in The Five Man Army
Bambino in They Call Me Trinity
Bambino in Trinity Is Still My Name
Salud in ... All the Way, Boys!
Hiram Coburn in It Can Be Done Amigo
Rosario Rao in Black Turin
Eli Sampson in A Reason to Live, a Reason to Die
Charlie Smith in Even Angels Eat Beans
Inspector "Flatfoot" Rizzo in Flatfoot
Ben in Watch Out, We're Mad!
Father Pedro de Leon in Two Missionaries
Wilbur Walsh in Crime Busters
Bulldozer in They Called Him Bulldozer
Charlie Firpo in Odds and Evens
Tom in I'm for the Hippopotamus
Scott Hall in The Sheriff and the Satellite Kid
Scott Hall in Everything Happens to Me
Charlie O'Brien in Who Finds a Friend Finds a Treasure
Banana Joe in Banana Joe
Bud Graziano in Bomber
Alan Parker in Cat and Dog
Doug O'Riordan in Go for It
Greg Wonder in Double Trouble
Steve Forest in Miami Supercops
The Genie in Superfantagenio
Bull Webster in Speaking of the Devil

References

External links

 
 
 
 

1936 births
2009 deaths
Italian male film actors
Italian male voice actors
Italian male television actors
Italian male stage actors
Actors from Turin
Accademia Nazionale di Arte Drammatica Silvio D'Amico alumni
20th-century Italian male actors
21st-century Italian male actors
People of Sicilian descent